The 1949 Louisville Cardinals football team was an American football team that represented the University of Louisville as an independent during the 1949 college football season. In their fourth season under head coach Frank Camp, the Cardinals compiled an 8–3 record. The team was led on offense by Ross Lucia and played its home games at DuPont Manual Stadium in Louisville, Kentucky.

Schedule

References

Louisville
Louisville Cardinals football seasons
Louisville Cardinals football